BEF may refer to:

British Equestrian Federation
British Expeditionary Force (World War I)
British Expeditionary Force (World War II)
Brazilian Expeditionary Force
BEF (image format), High Dynamic Range imaging format
B.E.F. (British Electric Foundation)
Bonus Expeditionary Force
Belgian franc, ISO 4217 currency code for the former currency of Belgium
Bluefields Airport (IATA Code: BEF) in Bluefields, Nicaragua
Bonneville Environmental Foundation
Bibliothèque des Ecoles françaises d'Athènes et de Rome
Binary entropy function